Catherine Murphy (born 1 September 1953) is an Irish Social Democrats politician who has been a Teachta Dála (TD) for the Kildare North constituency since the 2011 general election, and previously from 2005 to 2007. She previously was the joint Leader of the Social Democrats from 2015 to 2023. In February 2023, she announced that she would stand down as co-leader of the Social Democrats.

Early and personal life
Murphy was raised in Palmerstown in Dublin, but moved to Leixlip in County Kildare in 1978. Her husband is Derek Murphy, together they have two children.

Political career

Workers' Party and Democratic Left
Originally becoming involved in politics through campaigns against high local service charges in Leixlip, she joined the Workers' Party in 1983. She first held political office in 1988, when she was elected to Leixlip Town Commission. She stood unsuccessfully as a Workers' Party candidate for the Leinster constituency at the 1989 European Parliament election and for the Kildare constituency at the 1989 general election.

In 1991, she was elected to Kildare County Council for the Celbridge local electoral area. When the Workers' Party split in 1992, she followed Proinsias De Rossa into the new Democratic Left, and stood unsuccessfully as a Democratic Left candidate in Kildare at the 1992 and 1997 general elections.

She opposed Democratic Left's merger with the Labour Party in 1998, criticising the party as "highly opportunistic". She also stated that she would refuse to join a merged entity. However, in the 1999 local elections, she was re-elected to Kildare County Council, this time for the Leixlip local electoral area representing the Labour Party, she also won a seat on Leixlip Town Council.

Independent politician
She resigned from the Labour Party in June 2003, citing what she termed "destructive internal intrigues". She stood as an independent at the 2004 local elections and was re-elected to both council seats, topping the poll.

Charlie McCreevy, the Fianna Fáil TD for Kildare North, resigned from the Dáil in November 2004, when he was appointed as a European Commissioner. Murphy contested the resulting by-election in March 2005 as an independent candidate, and won the seat. On a low turnout, she polled slightly fewer first-preference votes than Fianna Fáil's Áine Brady, but was elected on the fifth count. Her by-election campaign had the backing of several other prominent independent TDs such as Tony Gregory and Marian Harkin. Murphy's campaign was based on such issues as transport, local government, affordable housing and education, and after her victory she promised to be a "thorn in the side" of the government.

At the 2007 general election, she lost her seat to her by-election opponent Áine Brady. Brady was elected on the first count; Murphy held on until the last, when Fine Gael's Bernard Durkan reached the quota by transfers from his eliminated running mate. In July 2008, she regained the council seat she had formerly held before her election as a TD (due to the dual mandate) when the councillor that replaced her, Gerry McDonagh, resigned his seat.

She was re-elected to the council at the 2009 local elections, topping the poll with over 2,000 more votes than the quota. She was also re-elected to Leixlip Town Council.

Murphy officiated as the group leader for the other independent councillors on Kildare County Council: Paddy Kennedy, Seamie Moore and Pádraig McEvoy.

Murphy regained her Dáil seat following the 2011 general election. She sat in the Technical group where she was the chief whip.

On 20 September 2011, Murphy confirmed she had signed papers nominating Senator David Norris as a candidate at the 2011 presidential election, she said, "to ensure that [Senator David Norris] can be judged not by fellow politicians but by the people of Ireland."

She was critical of the household charge, describing it as a "fundamentally unfair" one.

Denis O'Brien controversy
In 2015, billionaire Denis O'Brien successfully applied for an injunction against RTÉ preventing the state broadcaster from airing a report on how O'Brien was receiving, with the direct permission of former CEO of the Irish Bank Resolution Corporation (IBRC)—the former Anglo Irish Bank, a rate of approximately 1.25% when IBRC should have been charging 7.5%. This in turn led to outstanding sums of upwards of €500 million. O'Brien then wrote to special liquidator Kieran Wallace to demand that these same favourable terms that were granted him by way of verbal agreement be continued. The Government of Ireland later appointed Wallace to conduct an investigation into these same dealings. Wallace then cooperated with IBRC and Denis O'Brien to seek an injunction in Ireland's High Court to hide this information from the public. High Court Judge Donald Binchy granted O'Brien the injunction and told the court that certain elements of the judgement would have to be redacted. The Irish media therefore could not report on details of the injunction.

Murphy attempted to raise the issue in the Dáil on 27 May 2015. Ceann Comhairle Seán Barrett ruled her contributions "out of order". Murphy attempted to raise the matter again the following day, this time with more success. Lawyers acting for O'Brien immediately forced the country's media to censor its own coverage, with some media outlets confirming they had received warnings from O'Brien's lawyers. RTÉ reporter Philip Boucher-Hayes tweeted that Drivetime would play Murphy's speech; in the event, Murphy's speech was not broadcast and his tweet was later deleted. Tonight with Vincent Browne (with Browne absent and instead moderated by Ger Colleran, editor of INM's Irish Daily Star) featured Colleran reading a statement from TV3 management asserting that no discussion about Murphy's comments would be allowed following letters from O'Brien's lawyers. Foreign commentators covering these events for the international media suggested Irish democracy had been "wiped away at a stroke".

Social Democrats
On 15 July 2015, Murphy launched the Social Democrats party along with former independent TD Stephen Donnelly and former Labour Party TD Róisín Shortall.

On 22 February 2023, Murphy and Shortall announced that they would step down as co-leaders of the Social Democrats. They were succeeded by Holly Cairns on 1 March.

References

External links

 

1953 births
Living people
Democratic Left (Ireland) politicians
Independent TDs
Local councillors in County Kildare
Members of the 29th Dáil
Members of the 31st Dáil
Members of the 32nd Dáil
Politicians from Dublin (city)
Politicians from County Kildare
Social Democrats (Ireland) TDs
Workers' Party (Ireland) politicians
Members of the 33rd Dáil
21st-century women Teachtaí Dála